Karate at the 2021 Summer Deaflympics in Brazil.

Medal summary

Medalists

Men

Women

See also
 Karate at the 2017 Summer Deaflympics

References

External links

2021 Summer Deaflympics
2022 in karate
Karate competitions in Brazil